Alexander Neibaur (January 8, 1808 – December 15, 1883) was the first dentist to practice in Utah and first Jew to join the Latter Day Saint movement.  He was educated for the profession at the University of Berlin and was a skilled dentist before the establishment of dental schools in America. He was fluent in 7 languages and as many dialects.

Early life and career 
Neibaur was born in 1808 to Nathan and Rebecca Peretz Neibaur in Ehrenbreitstein, near Koblenz. Because that area had been incorporated into France by Napoleon, Neibaur's father served as a surgeon in the Army of France.

Neibaur was first educated to be a rabbi but concluded to become a surgeon and dentist. He received a degree to that end in 1827, before his 20th birthday. Neibaur converted to Christianity approximately two years later.  He moved to Preston, England, in 1830. On 15 September 1834, Neibaur married Ellen Breakel, who was from a Church of England family.

In 1837 he was converted to the Church of Jesus Christ of Latter-day Saints faith after reading the Book of Mormon in three days, but was persuaded to delay his baptism until the following spring that he might be more prepared for the ordinance. He was baptized into the Church of Jesus Christ of Latter Day Saints on 9 April 1838.

Career as Dentist and family 
Neibaur arrived in Nauvoo, Illinois on 18 April 1841. There he established his dental practice and developed a close friendship with Joseph Smith, Jr., whom he helped study German and Hebrew. His friendship was close enough that he heard an account of the First Vision which he recorded in his journal.

In 1846, after Smith's death, Neibaur and his wife remained in Nauvoo later than the first Mormon pioneers because Ellen was pregnant, but joined the second party. Neibaur was among the defenders of the city during the Battle of Nauvoo.

Neibaur then went to Winter Quarters, Nebraska, and arrived in the Salt Lake Valley, rejoining with the main body of The Church of Jesus Christ of Latter-day Saints (LDS Church) in 1848.  In Utah Territory he continued the practice of dentistry and was a manufacturer of matches. He was also the primary person to introduce Mormonism to Morris D. Rosenbaum, a Jew who later became his son-in-law. Neibaur's daughter Rebecca married industrialist and LDS Church leader Charles W. Nibley, thus Rosenbaum's brother-in-law, and early business partner. Rosenbaum was instrumental, with his second father-in-law President Lorenzo Snow, in the founding and development of Brigham City, Utah, and served as county commissioner and president of the North Germany Mission.  Alexander Neibaur's eldest daughter, Margaret Jane, married William Miller, the son of Eleazer Miller.  Margaret Neibaur Miller's father-in-law, Eleazer, converted and baptized Brigham Young (who would become the second prophet and President of The LDS Church).  Neibaur is a great-grandfather of scholars Hugh, Reid, and Richard Nibley, as well as founder of a large and diverse family to be found throughout the West. His great-great-granddaughter is American sociologist, life coach, and best-selling author Martha Beck.

Notes

References 
 Cornwall, J. Spencer. Stories of Our Mormon Hymns, (Salt Lake City: Deseret Book, 1975) pp. 246–247
 Ogden, D. Kelly, "Two From Judah Minister to Joseph" in Porter, Larry C., ed., Regional Studies in LDS History: Illinois (Provo, Utah: Brigham Young University, Religious Studies Center, 1995) pp. 232–237

The diary of Alexander Neibaur.

Further reading 
 .
 .
 .
 
 
 . The complete diary is in LDS Church Archives.

1808 births
1883 deaths
Alsatian Jews
American dentists
American people of German-Jewish descent
Converts to Mormonism from Judaism
German Latter Day Saints
Mormon pioneers
People from Koblenz
German emigrants to England
German emigrants to the United States
People from the Rhine Province
German dentists
19th-century dentists